FC Enerhetyk Burshtyn was a professional Ukrainian football club based in Burshtyn, Ivano-Frankivsk Oblast.

History
The club was formed in 1948 and was previously called Kolhospnyk (Collective] farmer), Avanhard (Vanguard) and Henerator (Generator).

The club played in the Ivano-Frankivs'k oblast league and in the 1990s and after steadily improving they won the Oblast Championship in 1998. They also entered the Ukrainian Amateur Championships and were undefeated champions in that season. The club was granted entry into the Ukrainian Professional Leagues in the next season (1998–99) in the Ukrainian Second League.

They competed in the Ukrainian First League struggling most of the time.
With 2 games to play in the 2011–12 Ukrainian First League season the club president announced that due to insufficient funds the club would withdraw from the PFL.

They had a farm-club FC Enerhetyk-Halychyna-2 Halych which plays in Ivano-Frankivsk Oblast championship.

The colors of the team were red and black.

Honors

Ukrainian Druha Liha: 

Runners Up: 2
 2002/03 Group A
 2004/05 Group A

Coaches
 Mykola Prystay (2002–03), (2005–08), (2009–10)
 Mykhaylo Savka (2008–09), (2010)
 Roman Pokora (2010)
 Serhiy Ptashnyk (2010–2011)
 Bohdan Blavatskyi (2011)
 Mykola Vitovskyi (caretaker) (2011–2012)
 Volodymyr Kovalyuk (2012)

League and cup history

{|class="wikitable"
|-bgcolor="#efefef"
! Season
! Div.
! Pos.
! Pl.
! W
! D
! L
! GS
! GA
! P
!Domestic Cup
!colspan=2|Europe
!Notes
|-
|align=center|1990
|align=center|4th 
|align=center|13
|align=center|30
|align=center|7
|align=center|7
|align=center|16
|align=center|27
|align=center|42
|align=center|21
|align=center|–
|align=center|
|align=center|
|align=center|
|-
|align=center|1991
|align=center|4th 
|align=center|11
|align=center|28
|align=center|9
|align=center|3
|align=center|16
|align=center|34
|align=center|45
|align=center|21
|align=center|–
|align=center|
|align=center|
|align=center|
|-
|align=center rowspan=2|1997–98
|align=center rowspan=2|4th
|align=center bgcolor=gold|1
|align=center|8
|align=center|6
|align=center|2
|align=center|0
|align=center|10
|align=center|3
|align=center|20
!align=center|Ukrainian Amateur Cup
|align=center rowspan=2|
|align=center rowspan=2|
|align=center|
|-
|align=center bgcolor=gold|1
|align=center|4
|align=center|4
|align=center|0
|align=center|0
|align=center|8
|align=center|1
|align=center|12
|align=center bgcolor=tan| finals
|align=center|
|-
|align=center rowspan=2|1998–99
|align=center rowspan=2|3rd "A"
|align=center rowspan=2|11
|align=center rowspan=2|28
|align=center rowspan=2|9
|align=center rowspan=2|7
|align=center rowspan=2|12
|align=center rowspan=2|23
|align=center rowspan=2|30
|align=center rowspan=2|34
!align=center|Ukrainian Cup
|align=center rowspan=2|
|align=center rowspan=2|
|align=center rowspan=2|
|-
|align=center|Did not enter
|-
|align=center|1999–00
|align=center|3rd "A"
|align=center bgcolor=tan|3
|align=center|30
|align=center|16
|align=center|5
|align=center|9
|align=center|38
|align=center|27
|align=center|53
|align=center|1/16 finals Second League Cup
|align=center|
|align=center|
|align=center|
|-
|align=center|2000–01
|align=center|3rd "A"
|align=center|9
|align=center|30
|align=center|11
|align=center|8
|align=center|11
|align=center|34
|align=center|34
|align=center|41
|align=center|1/4 finals Second League Cup
|align=center|
|align=center|
|align=center|
|-
|align=center|2001–02
|align=center|3rd "A"
|align=center|12
|align=center|36
|align=center|11
|align=center|8
|align=center|17
|align=center|49
|align=center|54
|align=center|41
|align=center|3rd round
|align=center|
|align=center|
|align=center|
|-
|align=center|2002–03
|align=center|3rd "A"
|align=center bgcolor=silver|2
|align=center|28
|align=center|19
|align=center|2
|align=center|7
|align=center|44
|align=center|23
|align=center|59
|align=center|1/32 finals
|align=center|
|align=center|
|align=center|
|-
|align=center|2003–04
|align=center|3rd "A"
|align=center|5
|align=center|30
|align=center|14
|align=center|7
|align=center|9
|align=center|41
|align=center|28
|align=center|46
|align=center|1/32 finals
|align=center|
|align=center|
|align=center|
|-
|align=center|2004–05
|align=center|3rd "A"
|align=center bgcolor=silver|2
|align=center|28
|align=center|15
|align=center|6
|align=center|7
|align=center|43
|align=center|29
|align=center|51
|align=center|1/32 finals
|align=center|
|align=center|
|align=center bgcolor=green|Promoted
|-
|align=center|2005–06
|align=center|2nd
|align=center|14
|align=center|34
|align=center|8
|align=center|12
|align=center|14
|align=center|31
|align=center|44
|align=center|36
|align=center|1/32 finals
|align=center|
|align=center|
|align=center|
|-
|align=center|2006–07
|align=center|2nd
|align=center|15
|align=center|36
|align=center|10
|align=center|9
|align=center|17
|align=center|31
|align=center|46
|align=center|39
|align=center|1/16 finals
|align=center|
|align=center|
|align=center|
|-
|align=center|2007–08
|align=center|2nd
|align=center|13
|align=center|38
|align=center|13
|align=center|9
|align=center|16
|align=center|39
|align=center|44
|align=center|48
|align=center|1/16 finals
|align=center|
|align=center|
|align=center|
|-
|align=center|2008–09
|align=center|2nd
|align=center|14
|align=center|32
|align=center|8
|align=center|7
|align=center|17
|align=center|29
|align=center|43
|align=center|31
|align=center|1/32 finals
|align=center|
|align=center|
|align=center|
|-
|align=center|2009–10
|align=center|2nd
|align=center|15
|align=center|34
|align=center|8
|align=center|11
|align=center|15
|align=center|32
|align=center|49
|align=center|35
|align=center|1/16 finals
|align=center|
|align=center|
|align=center|
|-
|align=center|2010–11
|align=center|2nd
|align=center|16
|align=center|34
|align=center|10
|align=center|6
|align=center|18
|align=center|29
|align=center|49
|align=center|36
|align=center|1/32 finals
|align=center|
|align=center|
|align=center|
|-
|align=center|2011–12
|align=center|2nd
|align=center|18
|align=center|34
|align=center|5
|align=center|4
|align=center|25
|align=center|26
|align=center|72
|align=center|19
|align=center|1/16 finals
|align=center|
|align=center|
|align=center bgcolor=pink|withdrew
|}

See also
 Burshtyn TES
 FC Karpaty Halych

Notes and references

External links
  Fans Web Site
  Official Web Site

 
Football clubs in Burshtyn
Defunct football clubs in Ukraine
1948 establishments in Ukraine
2012 disestablishments in Ukraine
Association football clubs established in 1948
Association football clubs disestablished in 2012